László Fenyvesi (6 August 1908 – 24 November 1993) was a Hungarian footballer and manager that represented his country internationally.

International career

Coaching career
In summer 1958 he was appointed manager of FK Sarajevo and qualified the club to the Yugoslav First League. After being sacked a few months into the season, he took over their city rivals FK Željezničar whom he led until mid 1959.

References

1908 births
1993 deaths
Hungarian footballers
Hungary international footballers
Association football forwards
Hungarian football managers
Hungarian expatriate football managers
FK Sarajevo managers
Expatriate football managers in Poland
Expatriate football managers in Yugoslavia
Hungarian expatriate sportspeople in Poland
Hungarian expatriate sportspeople in Yugoslavia